Ayod is a town in Jonglei, South Sudan, headquarters of Ayod County.
The Nuer people are the main inhabitants.
Riek Machar, first vice-president of South Sudan, is the 26th son of the chief of both Ayod and Leer.

A study of the village in December 1994 examined 759 people and found that 156, or 20.6%, had Guinea worm lesions.
Dracunculiasis, the parasitical infection by the Guinea worm, is caused by drinking contaminated water, and can be eliminated by providing a clean water supply.

References

Populated places in Jonglei State